Jamie Clarke (born 5 October 1994) is a Welsh professional snooker player.

Career
Clarke drew attention in 2014 when he defeated former world number 8 Darren Morgan in 6–0 whitewash in the semi-finals of the Welsh Amateur Championship before going on to defeat Lee Walker to capture the highest ranking and most prestigious amateur event in Wales. In 2015 Clarke entered several events in an attempt to qualify for the World Snooker Tour and narrowly missed out by losing in the final of tournaments on 3 occasions. In April, Clarke lost 3–4 in a final-frame decider to Martin O'Donnell in the final round of the EBSA Qualifying Tour Play-off. Clarke would go on to enter Q School in May 2015, but would be unable to advance further than the third round. In June 2015, Clarke qualified for the knockout stage of EBSA European Snooker Championship as the 19th seed where he lost 4–7 to Michael Wild in the final.

The following month at the IBSF World Under-21 Snooker Championship Clarke once again reached the tournament final before losing 7–8 in the deciding frame to Boonyarit Keattikun. In February 2016, Clarke once again reached the final of the EBSA European Snooker Championship as the number 1 seed, however he was once again defeated 4–7 losing to fellow countryman Jak Jones. Two months later Clarke again lost a final-frame decider 3–4 to Elliot Slessor in the final round of the EBSA Qualifying Tour Play-off. This was Clarke's fifth defeat in the final round of a tournament to qualify for the World Snooker Tour. Clarke was finally able to gain professional status at the sixth attempt, in the EBSA Tour Qualifying Play-offs, thanks to victories over former World Championship semi-finalist Andy Hicks and English amateur George Pragnall.

He qualified for the first time for the 2020 World Snooker Championship, defeating Mark Allen 10–8 in the first round despite Allen scoring 5 centuries. Clarke was involved in a controversial incident during his second round match against  Anthony McGill. Clarke was leading 7–2 when McGill complained to him directly that he had stood in his eyeline on several occasions during the match while he was getting down on a shot. Referee Jan Verhaas intervened but it seemed to unsettle Clarke after he won the frame. During the interval he tweeted 'You want to dance, let's dance.' McGill won the remaining five frames of the session to trail 7–8. Ultimately the match went to a decider; Clarke was in first during the deciding frame before failing to escape from a snooker, and leaving a free ball. This was enough for McGill to win the match and see Clarke lose 12–13.

Clarke's campaign at the 2021 World Snooker Championship ended in a similar fashion. In the last qualifying round, he led Mark Davis 7-2 after the first session before Davis won seven frames on a spin in the second session, with Clarke eventually losing 8–10.

Performance and rankings timeline

Career finals

Amateur finals: 5 (2 titles)

Team finals: 1

References

External links
Jamie Clarke at worldsnooker.com

Welsh snooker players
Living people
1994 births
Snooker players from Llanelli